The Woodrow Wilson House was the residence of the twenty-eighth President of the United States, Woodrow Wilson after he left office.  It is at 2340 S Street NW just off Washington, D.C.'s Embassy Row.  On February 3, 1924, Wilson died in an upstairs bedroom.  It was designated a National Historic Landmark in 1964.  The National Trust for Historic Preservation owns the house and operates it as a museum.

History
The house was built by Henry Fairbanks in 1915 on a design by prominent masonic Washington architect Waddy Wood. President Woodrow Wilson bought it in the last months of his second term as President of the United States as a gift to his wife, Edith Bolling Wilson.  He presented her the deed in December 1920, although he had never seen the house.  The former president and his wife moved into the home on Inauguration Day, which in 1921 was March 4 (not the current date of January 20).  Wilson made several modifications to the house, including a billiard room, stacks for his library of over 8,000 books, and a one-story brick garage.

It was from the balcony of the house that Wilson addressed a crowd on November 11, 1923, as his last public appearance.  While the Wilsons had few guests, former British Prime Minister David Lloyd George and former French Prime Minister Georges Clemenceau did visit the ailing former president there.  After Wilson's death in 1924, Edith Wilson lived there until her death on December 28, 1961. She hosted First Lady Jacqueline Kennedy for a brunch in the formal dining room. Edith bequeathed the property and all of its original furnishings to the National Trust for Historic Preservation.

In the years since President Wilson's death visitors and staff of this house and several others built by Wood in the DC area have reported seeing or hearing what they believed to be ghosts.

See also
 List of residences of presidents of the United States
 Presidential memorials in the United States

References

External links 

 National Park Service site on Woodrow Wilson House
 Woodrow Wilson: Prophet of Peace, a National Park Service Teaching with Historic Places (TwHP) lesson plan
 National Trust site for Woodrow Wilson House

Houses completed in 1915
Woodrow Wilson
Presidential homes in the United States
Historic house museums in Washington, D.C.
National Historic Landmarks in Washington, D.C.
Houses on the National Register of Historic Places in Washington, D.C.
Colonial Revival architecture in Washington, D.C.
Georgian Revival architecture in Washington, D.C.
Presidential museums in Washington, D.C.
National Trust for Historic Preservation